On October 21, 2016, three consecutive distributed denial-of-service attacks were launched against the Domain Name System (DNS) provider Dyn. The attack caused major Internet platforms and services to be unavailable to large swathes of users in Europe and North America. The groups Anonymous and New World Hackers claimed responsibility for the attack, but scant evidence was provided.

As a DNS provider, Dyn provides to end-users the service of mapping an Internet domain name—when, for instance, entered into a web browser—to its corresponding IP address. The distributed denial-of-service (DDoS) attack was accomplished through numerous DNS lookup requests from tens of millions of IP addresses. The activities are believed to have been executed through a botnet consisting of many Internet-connected devices—such as printers, IP cameras, residential gateways and baby monitors—that had been infected with the Mirai malware.

Affected services 
Services affected by the attack included:

 Airbnb
 Amazon.com
 Ancestry.com
 The A.V. Club
 BBC
 The Boston Globe
 Box
 Business Insider
 CNN
 Comcast
 CrunchBase
 DirecTV
 The Elder Scrolls Online
 Electronic Arts
 Etsy
 Evergreen ILS
 FiveThirtyEight
 Fox News
 The Guardian
 GitHub
 Grubhub
 HBO
 Heroku
 HostGator
 iHeartRadio
 Imgur
 Indiegogo
 Mashable
 National Hockey League
 Netflix
 The New York Times
 Overstock.com
 PayPal
 Pinterest
 Pixlr
 PlayStation Network
 Qualtrics
 Quora
 Reddit
 Roblox
 Ruby Lane
 RuneScape
 SaneBox
 Seamless
 Second Life
 Shopify
 Slack
 SoundCloud
 Squarespace
 Spotify
 Starbucks
 Storify
 Swedish Civil Contingencies Agency
 Swedish Government
 Tumblr
 Twilio
 Twitter
 Verizon Communications
 Visa
 Vox Media
 Walgreens
 The Wall Street Journal
 Wikia
 Wired
 Wix.com
 WWE Network
 Xbox Live
 Yammer
 Yelp
 Zillow

Investigation

The US Department of Homeland Security started an investigation into the attacks, according to a White House source. No group of hackers claimed responsibility during or in the immediate aftermath of the attack. Dyn's chief strategist said in an interview that the assaults on the company's servers were very complex and unlike everyday DDoS attacks. Barbara Simons, a member of the advisory board of the United States Election Assistance Commission, said such attacks could affect electronic voting for overseas military or civilians.

Dyn disclosed that, according to business risk intelligence firm FlashPoint and Akamai Technologies, the attack was a botnet coordinated through numerous Internet of Things-enabled (IoT) devices, including cameras, residential gateways, and baby monitors, that had been infected with Mirai malware. The attribution of the attack to the Mirai botnet had been previously reported by BackConnect Inc., another security firm. Dyn stated that they were receiving malicious requests from tens of millions of IP addresses. Mirai is designed to brute-force the security on an IoT device, allowing it to be controlled remotely.

Cybersecurity investigator Brian Krebs noted that the source code for Mirai had been released onto the Internet in an open-source manner some weeks prior, which made the investigation of the perpetrator more difficult.

On 25 October 2016, US President Obama stated that the investigators still had no idea who carried out the cyberattack.

On 13 December 2017, the Justice Department announced that three men (Paras Jha, 21, Josiah White, 20, and Dalton Norman, 21) had entered guilty pleas in cybercrime cases relating to the Mirai and clickfraud botnets.

Perpetrators
In correspondence with the website Politico, hacktivist groups SpainSquad, Anonymous, and New World Hackers claimed responsibility for the attack in retaliation against Ecuador's rescinding Internet access to WikiLeaks founder Julian Assange, at their embassy in London, where he had been granted asylum. This claim has yet to be confirmed. WikiLeaks alluded to the attack on Twitter, tweeting "Mr. Assange is still alive and WikiLeaks is still publishing. We ask supporters to stop taking down the US internet. You proved your point." New World Hackers has claimed responsibility in the past for similar attacks targeting sites like BBC and ESPN.com.

On October 26, FlashPoint stated that the attack was most likely done by script kiddies.

A November 17, 2016, a Forbes article reported that the attack was likely carried out by "an angry gamer".

A September 20, 2018, a WeLiveSecurity article stated that its three creators meant it as a way of gaining an advantage in fierce competition surrounding the computer game Minecraft – by preventing players from using competitors’ servers and driving them to their own servers in order to ultimately make money off them.

On December 9, 2020, one of the perpetrators pleaded guilty to taking part in the attack. The perpetrator's name was withheld due to his or her age.

See also

 WannaCry ransomware attack
 Mirai (malware)
 Vulnerability (computing)

References

2016 in computing
Denial-of-service attacks
October 2016 crimes in Europe
October 2016 crimes in the United States
Internet of things
WikiLeaks
Botnets
Malware
Domain Name System
Hacking in the 2010s
Cloud infrastructure attacks and failures
2010s internet outages